In mathematics, in the realm of group theory, a subgroup of a group is said to be centrally closed if the centralizer of any nonidentity element of the subgroup lies inside the subgroup.

Some facts about centrally closed subgroups:

 Every malnormal subgroup is centrally closed.
 Every Frobenius kernel is centrally closed.
 SA subgroups are precisely the centrally closed Abelian subgroups.
 The trivial subgroup and the whole group are centrally closed.

Subgroup properties